0800 Reverse is a reverse charge (collect) call service that provides reverse charge calls within the United Kingdom. The service is operated by Reverse Corp Ltd. An 0800 Reverse charge call is placed by dialing the phoneword 0800 REVERSE (i.e. 0800 7383773), and the number can be dialled as a free call from most out-of-credit mobile phones, and most fixed land lines. 0800 Reverse has been advertised in television campaigns featuring Holly Valance, and the service is advertised on many phone boxes throughout the United Kingdom.

As of October 2022, the number is dial-able but a "The number is undergoing scheduled maintenance" message is told.

The number's sibling, MUMDAD (686323, 0800 686323 and 08000686323) that functions the same, (makes reverse calls) also seems to have stopped working.

The website also has been taken offline, as while it appears in Google search results, clicking any links for the 0800reverse website will display a browser message saying that the domain does not exist.

Complaints
In 2007, a complaint was raised with the Advertising Standards Authority (ASA), that the terms and conditions of the 0800 Reverse service were not made sufficiently apparent in their television advertisements. The ASA decided that the cost was likely to influence a viewer's decision to use the service and a recipient's decision whether to accept a call. They found that the call charge information was not sufficiently legible for it to be easily absorbed by viewers in one viewing, and ordered that the onscreen text regarding pricing be made more prominent.

The service was also the subject of a Watchdog investigation due to its high charges, and failure to inform users of its cost.

References

Telephone numbers in the United Kingdom
Calling features